Mister World 1998 was the 2nd edition of the Mister World competition. It was held on September 18, 1998 in the Tróia Peninsula, Grândola, Portugal. Tom Nuyens of Belgium crowned Sandro Finoglio of Venezuela at the end of the event.

Results

Placements

Special Awards

Contestants

References

Mister World
1998 beauty pageants
1998 in Portugal
Beauty pageants in Portugal